Jens Beckert (born 21 July 1967, in Frankfurt am Main) is a German sociologist with a strong interest in economic sociology. The author of books on inherited wealth and the social foundations of economic efficiency, he focuses on the role of the economy in society – especially based on studies of markets – as well as organizational sociology, the sociology of inheritance, and sociological theory. He is director at the Max Planck Institute for the Study of Societies (MPIfG) in Cologne, Germany, and a member of the Berlin-Brandenburg Academy of Sciences and Humanities.

Education and career 
Beckert earned his MA in sociology at the New School for Social Research in New York City in 1991 and his MBA at Free University of Berlin in 1993. He earned his doctorate with a dissertation in the field of economic sociology in 1996 at Free University of Berlin and his habilitation at the same university with a book on the sociology of inheritance in 2003.
 
An associate professorship in sociology at International University Bremen (2002–2003) and a professorship in sociology at the University of Göttingen (2003–2005) preceded Beckert’s appointment at age 37 as director at the Max Planck Institute for the Study of Societies (MPIfG), which conducts basic research on the governance of modern societies. Beckert has had visiting fellowships at Princeton University, Harvard University, the European University Institute in Florence, the Center for the Sociology of Organizations (CSO) in Paris, and the Paris Institute for Advanced Study. He gave a Mario Einaudi Lecture at the Center for International Studies at Cornell University in 2007.

Current position and activities 
He is director at the Max Planck Institute for the Study of Societies (MPIfG) in Cologne. In addition, Beckert is a member of the Faculty of Management, Economics and Social Sciences at the University of Cologne. He is a faculty member and chair of the International Max Planck Research School on the Social and Political Constitution of the Economy, a doctoral program run jointly by the MPIfG and the Faculty of Management at the University of Cologne. He is a member of the Joint Council of the Max Planck Sciences Po Center on Coping with Instability in Market Societies at Sciences Po Paris, which investigates how individuals, organizations, and nation-states cope with new forms of economic and social instability in Western societies and is a unique innovation in Franco-German collaboration in the social sciences reflecting the Max Planck Society's aim to put its operations on an international footing. Beckert is an editor of the European Journal of Sociology and a member of the editorial board of Socio-Economic Review. He was council member of the Economic Sociology Section of the American Sociological Association (ASA).

Research

Economies as social orders within societies
Jens Beckert’s current work at the Max Planck Institute for the Study of Societies reflects a research program he has developed with his codirector Wolfgang Streeck which “proposes to invest in a theory of social action as the most promising approach to a deeper understanding and an improved theorization of the economy as a socially and politically constituted system of action.”

“Any economy is socially and politically constructed. The way it is socially embedded reflects both prevailing systems of meaning and the results of political ‘market struggles’ over social regulation. Investigating institutional regulation of the economy requires studying how economies are constituted as social orders within societies.”

Markets from a sociological perspective
In his research cluster on the “Sociology of Markets,” Beckert focuses on “markets as the core institution of capitalist economies,” seeking “to understand the functioning of markets from a distinctively sociological perspective.” Analyzing markets “from a Weberian viewpoint as arenas of social struggle in which actors confront each other under conditions of competition,” he explores the “social, cultural, and political underpinnings for the development of the order of markets.”

Embeddedness of economic action
“The problem of uncertainty market actors face when making decisions” is a key issue in Beckert’s research, which examines “the coordination problems market participants must cope with” – the problems of value, competition, and cooperation. “Uncertainty also provides a theoretical opening to explain the embeddedness of economic action.”

Awards and honours 
 2010: Appointed to the Berlin-Brandenburg Academy of Sciences and Humanities
 2005: Best Law Book of the Year, by the German law journal Neue Juristische Wochenschrift, his book Unverdientes Vermögen [Unearned Wealth]
 2005: Prize of the Berlin-Brandenburg Academy of Sciences and Humanities donated by the Commerzbank Foundation. In its tribute, the Academy states that Jens Beckert is “one of the most original and productive sociologists of his generation, both nationally and internationally. He is considered a leading proponent of a new economic sociology [...].”

Selected publications

Books
 Imagined Futures: Fictional Expectations and Capitalist Dynamics. Cambridge, MA: Harvard University Press 2016.
 Constructing Quality: The Classification of Goods in Markets. Oxford: Oxford University Press 2013 (ed. with Christine Musselin). 
 The Worth of Goods: Valuation and Pricing in the Economy. New York: Oxford University Press 2011 (ed. with Patrick Aspers).
 Inherited Wealth. Princeton: Princeton University Press 2008. (German edition: Unverdientes Vermögen: Soziologie des Erbrechts. Frankfurt a.M.: Campus, 2004).
 Beyond the Market: The Social Foundations of Economic Efficiency. Princeton: Princeton University Press 2002. (German edition: Grenzen des Marktes. Frankfurt a.M.: Campus 1997).

Articles

References

External links 
 Homepage Jens Beckert
 Personal Portrait – Jens Beckert In: MaxPlanckResearch, 3/2006
 Publication list
 Jens Beckert in the WorldCat catalog (accessed via Karlsruhe Virtual Catalog)
 Max Planck Sciences Po Center on Coping with Instability in Market Societies
 International Max Planck Research School on the Social and Political Constitution of the Economy

Living people
German sociologists
Writers from Frankfurt
1967 births
Max Planck Society people
The New School alumni
Academic staff of the University of Cologne
Free University of Berlin alumni
Academic staff of the University of Göttingen
Max Planck Institute directors